Might and Magic Heroes Online was a free-to-play MMORPG released in September 2014, and closed in December 2020, developed by Blue Byte. It is  part of the Heroes of Might and Magic franchise.

References

2014 video games
Ubisoft games
Browser games
Browser-based multiplayer online games
Free-to-play video games
Heroes of Might and Magic
Strategy video games
Video games developed in Germany
Blue Byte games